The localities in following lists have been developed directly as Garden Cities or their development has been heavily influenced by the Garden City movement.

Europe 
Finland
 Käpylä, Finland
 Kauniainen, Finland
 Tapiola, Finland

France
Garden City, Suresnes, Suresnes, designed by Alexandre Maistrasse, Julien Quoniam and Félix Dumail
Garden City, Stains, Stains, designed by Eugène Gonnot and Georges Albenque
Garden City, Pré-Saint-Gervais, Pré-Saint-Gervais, designed by Félix Dumail

Germany
 Frohnau, Berlin, Germany
 , Mannheim, Germany
 Hellerau, Dresden, Germany

Ireland
 Marino, Dublin, Ireland
 Castle Park, Ashbourne, Co. Meath, Ireland

Italy
 Città Giardino Aniene (later Monte Sacro), Rome, Italy
 Garbatella, Rome, Italy

Poland
 Giszowiec, Katowice, Poland
 , Wrocław, Poland
 Konstancin-Jeziorna, Poland
 Milanówek, Poland
 Podkowa Leśna, Poland
 Radom, Poland

United Kingdom
 Bedford Park, London, England
 Bournville Village, Birmingham, England 
 Brentham Garden Suburb, London, England
 Glenrothes, Fife, Scotland
 Glyn Cory Garden Village (now Wyndham Park), Vale of Glamorgan, Wales
 Hampstead Garden Suburb, London, England
 Kinmel bay, Conwy, Wales
 Letchworth Garden City, Hertfordshire, England
  Manor, Sheffield, South Yorkshire, England
 Moor Pool, Birmingham, England
 Milton Keynes, Buckinghamshire, England
 Penkhull Garden Village, Stoke-on-Trent, England
 Rosyth, Fife, Scotland
 St Helier, London, England
 Telford, Shropshire, England
 The Garden Village, Kingston upon Hull, Yorkshire, England
 Welwyn Garden City, Hertfordshire, England
 Wythenshawe, Manchester, England

Rest of Europe
 Yerevan (Kentron District), Armenia 
 Akademgorodok, Russia.
 Covaresa, Valladolid, Spain
 Mežaparks, Riga, Latvia
 Žaliakalnis, Kaunas, Lithuania
 Svit, Slovakia
 Ullevål Hageby, Norway
 Velenje, Slovenia
 Wekerle estate, Budapest, Hungary
 Zelenograd, Moscow, Russia
 Zlín, Czech Republic
 Encarnação, Lisbon, Portugal

North America 
Canada
 Grand Falls-Windsor, Newfoundland and Labrador (1905)
 Prince Rupert, British Columbia (1910)
 Town of Mount-Royal, Quebec (1912)
 Gardenvale neighbourhood, Sainte-Anne-de-Bellevue, Quebec, (ca. 1918)
 Kapuskasing, Ontario (1921)
 Corner Brook, Newfoundland and Labrador (1923)
 Cité-jardin du Tricentenaire (Tricentennial Garden-City) Montreal, Quebec (1940–1947),
 Kitimat, British Columbia (1951)

United States
 Augusta, Georgia (1900) 
 Forest Hills, Queens, (start date 1908)
 Jackson Heights, New York City 
 Forest Hills, Boston (1911)
 Park Circle, North Charleston, South Carolina (ca. 1912)
 Narbrook Park, Narberth, Pennsylvania (c. 1915)
 Fairview, Camden, New Jersey, United States (1918)
 Mariemont, Ohio (1923)
 Sunnyside Gardens Historic District, Queens, New York, United States (1920s)
 Radburn, New Jersey (1929)
Three New Deal Greenbelt communities:
 Greenbelt, Maryland (1935) 
 Greenhills, Ohio (1930s) 
 Greendale, Wisconsin (1936)
 Chatham Village, Pittsburgh, Pennsylvania, United States (1930s)
 Wyvernwood Garden Apartments, Los Angeles, California (1939)
 Wilshire Village, Houston, Texas (1940, demolished 2009)
 Baldwin Hills Village, Los Angeles, California (1941)
 Epcot, Bay Lake, Florida (1960s)
 Village Homes, Davis, California, United States (1960s)
 Reston, Virginia, United States (1964)
 Paloma Del Sol, Temecula, California (1992)

South America 
Cianorte, Brazil
Ciudad Jardín Lomas del Palomar, Buenos Aires, Argentina
Goiânia, Brazil
Jardins, São Paulo, Brazil
Maringá, Brazil
Providencia, Chile
Viña del Mar, Chile

Australia and New Zealand 
 Haberfield, New South Wales, Sydney, Australia (1901)
 Daceyville (Dacey Garden Suburb), New South Wales, Sydney, Australia (1912)
 Colonel Light Gardens, Adelaide, Australia (1915)
 Garden City, Victoria, in inner bayside Melbourne (1926)
 Peter Lalor Housing Estate, Lalor, Victoria, Australia
 The Sunshine Estate, Sunshine, Victoria, Australia
 Canberra, Australia (1913)
 Christchurch, New Zealand
 Wundowie, Western Australia (1947)

Asia 
 Den-en-chōfu, Ōta, Tokyo, Japan
 Kowloon Tong, New Kowloon, Hong Kong
 Menteng, Jakarta, Indonesia
 Kebayoran Baru, Jakarta, Indonesia
 North Bandung, West Java, Indonesia
 Sha Tin, New Territories, Hong Kong
 Singapore
 Tel Aviv, Israel 
 Dalat, Vietnam 
 Model Town, Lahore, Pakistan

Africa 
 Edgemead, Milnerton, South Africa
Pinehurst, Durbanville, South Africa
 Pinelands, Cape Town, South Africa

References

 
Planned cities
Sustainable urban planning
Urban forestry
1898 introductions
Architecture related to utopias